Gustaf Thorell (born December 12, 1989) is a Swedish professional ice hockey player. He played with Modo Hockey in the Elitserien during the 2010–11 Elitserien season.

References

External links

1989 births
Living people
Modo Hockey players
Swedish ice hockey forwards
Sportspeople from Karlstad